Tawanda Muparati is a Zimbabwean professional footballer, who plays as a defender for How Mine F.C.

After injury hit season at Dynamos F.C. how left them, and join How Mine F.C.

International career
In January 2014, coach Ian Gorowa, invited him to be a part of the Zimbabwe squad for the 2014 African Nations Championship. He helped the team to a fourth-place finish after being defeated by Nigeria by a goal to nil.

References

External links

Living people
Zimbabwean footballers
Zimbabwe A' international footballers
2014 African Nations Championship players
1983 births
How Mine F.C. players
Association football defenders
Zimbabwe international footballers